Magistra Vitae is a Latin expression, used by Cicero in his De Oratore as a personification of history, means "life's teacher". Often paraphrased as Historia est Magistra Vitae, it conveys the idea that the study of the past should serve as a lesson to the future, and was an important pillar of classical, medieval and Renaissance historiography.

The complete phrase, with English translation, is:

Bibliography

References 

Latin words and phrases